Eddie is the sophomore studio album from Canadian electro-soul band Busty and the Bass. It was released on August 14, 2020, by Arts & Crafts.

Background
Eddie is the band's first release on Arts & Crafts, the Canadian record label home to notable acts such as Broken Social Scene, Japandroids, and BADBADNOTGOOD. It was announced on July 22, 2020. Like their previous full-length Uncommon Good, Eddie was produced by Neal Pogue, who was also heavily involved in the recording process. The album also features contributions from Verdine White of Earth, Wind & Fire, who served as an executive producer. According to the band, Eddie is intended to explore the question: “What advice would you impart on that younger self? And if you could pass your younger self a mixtape, what would it sound like?”.

Track listing
All tracks written and performed by Busty and the Bass.

Personnel
Personnel adapted from album liner notes.

Busty and the Bass
Scott Bevins – trumpet
Alistair Blu – lead and backup vocals, keyboard, synthesizer
Nick Ferraro – lead vocals, alto saxophone
Eric Haynes – piano, keyboard, string arrangements
Milo Johnson – bass
Louis Stein – guitar, vocals
Julian Trivers – drums
Chris Vincent – trombone

Additional musicians
Macy Gray – vocals (1)
George Clinton – vocals (3)
Amber Navran – vocals (4)
Jafé Paulino – vocals (9)
Jon Connor – vocals (10)
Illa J – vocals (10)
Freddy Spear – string arrangements, string performance (contrabass)
Georgia Vogeli – strings (violin)
Katelyn Emery – strings (violin)
Julien Altmann – strings (violin)
Thomas Beard – strings (cello)
Nora Toutain – additional vocals
Melissa Pacifico – additional vocals
Mario Allende – additional percussion

Recording personnel
Busty and the Bass – writing, recording, production
Neal Pogue – production, mixing, additional engineering, additional writing (3)
Verdine White – executive production
Christopher Vincent – engineering
Noah Mintz – mastering
George Clinton – additional writing (3)
Jon Connor – additional writing (10)
Illa J – additional writing (10)
James Benjamin – additional production (10)
Jafé Paulino – additional writing (9)
Peter Edwards – additional engineering
Jacob Lacroix-Cardinal – additional engineering

Artwork
June Barry – album artwork
Maya Fuhr – photography
Peter Albert Weir – layout design

References

2020 albums